O Chang-ran(오창란)  (born 5 September 1991) is  a North Korean former football goalkeeper who played for the North Korea women's national football team.

She competed at the  2012 Summer Olympics. At the club level, she played for Mangyongbong.

See also
 North Korea at the 2012 Summer Olympics

References

External links
 
 Profile at sports-reference.com
 

1991 births
Living people
North Korean women's footballers
Place of birth missing (living people)
Footballers at the 2012 Summer Olympics
Olympic footballers of North Korea
Women's association football goalkeepers
North Korea women's international footballers